Squamura roepkei is a moth in the family Cossidae. It is found on Peninsular Malaysia, Sumatra, Java and Borneo. The habitat consists of lowland areas.

References

Natural History Museum Lepidoptera generic names catalog

Metarbelinae
Moths described in 1982